Nurina Land District is a land district (cadastral division) of Western Australia, located within the Eucla Land Division on the Nullarbor Plain. It spans roughly 31°00'S - 32°20'S in latitude and 125°30'E - 127°30'E in longitude.

Location and features
The district is located on the Nullarbor Plain in the south-east of the state and falls generally between the Great Australian Bight to the south and the Trans-Australian Railway to the north. The Cocklebiddy and Madura roadhouses on the Eyre Highway, the railway siding of Loongana and much of the Nuytsland Nature Reserve are located within its boundaries.

History
The district was created on 4 March 1903, but only extended north to 31°15'S latitude. When the Trans-Australian Railway was being built in 1914, the district was extended northwards and was defined in the Government Gazette:

References

	

Land districts of Western Australia
Goldfields-Esperance